Wezilo, died 1088, was Archbishop of Mainz from 1084 to 1088. He was a leading supporter of the Holy Roman Emperor Henry IV in the Investiture Controversy, and of antipope Clement III.

A priest in Halberstadt, Wezilo owed his promotion to the support of Henry IV. In 1085 he negotiated on behalf of the emperor with the papal legate, the future Pope Urban II, and in the same year he was convicted of simony and excommunicated by the pro-papal Synod of Quedlinburg.

In May 1087 the forces of Clement III and "the imperialist prefect Wezilo" forced Pope Victor III to retreat from Rome.

Wezilo was buried in Mainz Cathedral.

References

Year of birth unknown
1088 deaths
Archbishops of Mainz
Investiture Controversy
Simony
11th-century Roman Catholic archbishops in the Holy Roman Empire